The Muslim Educational Society is an educational organisation established in 1964.

The society operates 150 educational facilities across Kerala, which include 28 colleges, 12 secondary schools and 36 Central Board of Secondary Education schools and has over 100,000 students. In 2019, the society banned face veils from its facilities, a decision that caused controversy.

See also
 Dr. Gafoor Memorial MES Mampad College
 M.E.S. Ponnani College, Ponnani
 MEA Engineering College, Perinthalmanna
 MES Asmabi College
 MES College of Engineering
 MES College of Engineering, Kuttippuram
 MES Kalladi College
 MES Keveeyam College, Valanchery

References

Further reading

External links
MES official site

1964 establishments in Kerala
Organisations based in Kozhikode